Antaeotricha virens is a moth in the family Depressariidae. It was described by Edward Meyrick in 1912. It is found in Colombia and Panama.

The wingspan is about 32 mm. The forewings are greenish-fuscous with the costal edge fulvous-brown, edged beneath with violet suffusion from the base to beyond the middle and with a small violet-white oblique mark beneath the costa at two-fifths and a large dull green patch occupying nearly the apical half of the wing, its anterior edge running from about the middle of the costa to two-thirds of the dorsum, but with its upper three-fifths forming a broad triangular projection which extends inwards to above the fold at one-fourth, the ground colour beneath this projection somewhat prominent outwardly and including a small indistinct group of whitish scales. The hindwings are whitish-ochreous, the basal three-fifths tinged with light fuscous.

References

Moths described in 1912
virens
Moths of Central America
Moths of South America